Peter Trevor Maxwell, 27th Baron de Ros (born 23 December 1958), is the premier baron of England, by virtue of Baron de Ros being the oldest extant barony in the Peerage of England.

Early life
Lord de Ros is the only son of Lieutenant-Commander John David Maxwell RN and of Georgiana Maxwell, 26th Baroness de Ros, a suo jure peeress. He inherited the barony on the death of his mother in 1983.

He was educated at Headfort School, in Kells, Ireland, as well as Down High School, in Downpatrick, Northern Ireland, before going to a boarding school in the Republic of Ireland.

Marriage and children
On 5 September 1987, Lord de Ros married Angela Sián Ross. They have three children:

 Hon. Finbar James Maxwell (born 14 November 1988), heir apparent to the peerage
 Hon. Katherine Georgiana Maxwell (born 26 October 1990)
 Hon. Jessye Maeve Maxwell (born 8 July 1992)

References

28
1958 births
Living people
People educated at Down High School

de Ros